Paraswammerdamia lutarea is a moth of the family Yponomeutidae. It is found in Europe.

The wingspan is 11–14 mm. The head is white, sometimes ochreous-tinged. Thorax fuscous, sometimes whitish-sprinkled. Forewings are fuscous-whitish, closely irrorated with dark fuscous; some longitudinal series of indistinct dark fuscous dots; a dark fuscous entire fascia before middle; a white costal spot before apex; cilia fuscous, with two darker lines. Hindwings are fuscous. The larva is deep brown; subdorsal line white, orange-spotted; spiracular white, on 5-1 2 orange-spotted above; head ochreous-brown, blackish-marked.

Adults are on wing in July depending on the location.

The larvae feed on Crataegus, Sorbus aucuparia, Rosa and Cotoneaster horizontalis.

References

External links
Ukmoths

Moths described in 1828
Yponomeutidae
Moths of Europe
Moths of Asia